James McEwen (16 October 1872 – 1942), also known as Jimmy McEwen or "Punch" McEwen, was an English professional footballer and coach.

McEwen started his playing career with Bootle, before moving south to join Luton Town. After one season, he then joined Glossop North End for their first season in the Football League. At the end of the season, North End gained promotion to the First Division. The club then changed their name to Glossop but finished the 1899–1900 season at the foot of the table.

McEwen then moved on to Bury, where he won the FA Cup in 1903, with a crushing 6–0 victory over Derby County. After three years at Gigg Lane, he returned for a spell at Luton Town (now in the Southern League), before joining Norwich City, initially as a player, before taking on the role of manager. McEwen was City's second manager, and was in charge for 43 matches between 1907 and 1908, winning 13, losing 20 and drawing 10 games

After leaving Norwich City he returned to Glossop as a player for the 1911–12 season. He then joined Fulham as a scout before in 1914 he joined Arsenal's coaching staff, working under manager George Morrell. After Morrell's resignation in 1915, McEwen took charge of first-team affairs at the club during the remainder of World War I, becoming the de facto caretaker manager of the team, which played in the London Combination. After the war had ended he was replaced by Leslie Knighton for the start of the 1919–20 season, but McEwen continued to stay with the club, working as a dressing-room attendant and as a coach under Herbert Chapman.

Honours

As a player
Glossop North End
Football League Second Division runners-up: 1898–99

Bury
FA Cup winner: 1903

References 

 

1872 births
1942 deaths
Sportspeople from Bootle
English footballers
Association football fullbacks
Bootle F.C. (1879) players
Liverpool South End F.C. players
Everton F.C. players
Bury F.C. players
Luton Town F.C. players
Norwich City F.C. players
Glossop North End A.F.C. players
Southern Football League players
English Football League players
English football managers
Norwich City F.C. managers
Arsenal F.C. non-playing staff
FA Cup Final players